George H. Walther (November 28, 1828July 30, 1895) was a German American immigrant, surveyor, and politician.  He served as a Union Army officer in the American Civil War and later served one term in the Wisconsin State Assembly, representing the north side of the city of Milwaukee.

Biography
Walther was born in the village of Betzigerode, in what was then the Electorate of Hesse in the German Confederation.  He attended the military academy at the nearby city of Kassel and worked as a civil engineer and surveyor.  In 1855, Walther emigrated to the United States and settled in Theresa, Dodge County, Wisconsin. He served as county surveyor and drainage commissioner for Dodge County. Walther was also justice of the peace and revenue inspector. During the American Civil War, Walther served as captain of Company I in the 7th Wisconsin Infantry Regiment and was wounded at the Battle of Gainesville.  He later returned to service as major with the 34th Wisconsin Infantry Regiment and was then promoted to lieutenant colonel of the 35th Wisconsin Volunteer Infantry Regiment. In 1866, Walther moved to Milwaukee, Wisconsin. In 1876, Walther served in the Wisconsin State Assembly on the Reform Party ticket. Walther died at his home in Milwaukee, Wisconsin as a result of the wounds he suffered during the American Civil War.

Personal life and family
George Walther married twice.  His first wife was Margaret Juneau, a daughter of the founder of Milwaukee, Solomon Juneau.

References

External links
 

1828 births
1895 deaths
Hessian emigrants to the United States
People from Theresa, Wisconsin
Politicians from Milwaukee
People of Wisconsin in the American Civil War
American surveyors
American civil engineers
Wisconsin Reformers (19th century)
County officials in Wisconsin
Members of the Wisconsin State Assembly
19th-century American politicians